Israeli military decorations are the decorations awarded to soldiers in the Israel Defense Forces who exhibit extraordinary bravery and courage.
Its decorations consist of the Medal of Valor (the highest decoration in the IDF), the Medal of Courage, and the Medal of Distinguished Service. It also includes the Citations (Tzalash), which are awarded in four classes.

Two soldiers share the title of being the most decorated soldier of the IDF: Captain Nechemya Cohen (1943–1967), and General Ehud Barak (formerly Chief of Staff, later Prime Minister).

Non-military decorations

Decorations

Citations (Tzalash)
Citations are worn on the campaign ribbon when awarded in times of war.

Campaign ribbons, medal and Badge

According to Israel Ministry of Defence, "'Campaign ribbons' are ribbons commemorating a person's participation in war, campaign and combat from the establishment of the State of Israel up to the present day. These ribbons are awarded by authorisation of government, the IDF decorations Act and regulations set up by the Minister of Defense."

Awards for military service 

According to Israel Ministry of Defence, "'Awards for military contribution towards the establishment of the State of Israel' and decorations are awarded by authorisation of government and a ministerial committee for symbols and ceremonies, with the exception of the Nazi Fighter Ribbon which is awarded according to the 'Yad Vashem' regulation in the Remembrance and Holocaust Act, and in addition by the 'status of the Second World War II' Act of 2000."

Other medals, awards and ribbons

References

External links

 Medals and Decorations of Israel
 Awards and Decorations of Israel

 
Military awards and decorations of Israel